The following lists events that happened during 1862 in Chile.

Incumbents
President of Chile: José Joaquín Pérez

Events 
date unknown - Cornelio Saavedra Rodríguez advances to Malleco.

Births
17 January - Javier Ángel Figueroa (d. 1945)

Deaths
20 August - Javiera Carrera (b. 1781)

References 

 
1860s in Chile
Chile
Chile
Years of the 19th century in Chile